Softune is an Integrated development environment from Fujitsu for the Fujitsu FR, FR-V and F²MC processor families. It provides an REALOS µITRON realtime kernel.

It is for example used for Nikon DSLRs (see Nikon EXPEED) and some Pentax K mount cameras.

References

External links
Fujitsu: Softune Workbench V6 32 bit Development Environment: Features, Documentation, Software: Downloads

C (programming language) compilers
C++ compilers
Integrated development environments